Glenbervie is a settlement in Northland, New Zealand. The city of Whangārei lies to the southwest, and the localities of Kiripaka and Ngunguru to the northeast. The Glenbervie Forest is north of the settlement.

Demographics

Abbey Caves-Glenbervie had a population of 1,329 at the 2018 New Zealand census, an increase of 192 people (16.9%) since the 2013 census, and an increase of 327 people (32.6%) since the 2006 census. There were 459 households, comprising 654 males and 672 females, giving a sex ratio of 0.97 males per female. The median age was 45.2 years (compared with 37.4 years nationally), with 261 people (19.6%) aged under 15 years, 180 (13.5%) aged 15 to 29, 651 (49.0%) aged 30 to 64, and 234 (17.6%) aged 65 or older.

Ethnicities were 92.1% European/Pākehā, 15.8% Māori, 1.6% Pacific peoples, 3.2% Asian, and 1.1% other ethnicities. People may identify with more than one ethnicity.

The percentage of people born overseas was 16.7, compared with 27.1% nationally.

Although some people chose not to answer the census's question about religious affiliation, 54.9% had no religion, 34.5% were Christian, 0.2% were Muslim, 0.2% were Buddhist and 2.5% had other religions.

Of those at least 15 years old, 237 (22.2%) people had a bachelor's or higher degree, and 141 (13.2%) people had no formal qualifications. The median income was $37,500, compared with $31,800 nationally. 252 people (23.6%) earned over $70,000 compared to 17.2% nationally. The employment status of those at least 15 was that 570 (53.4%) people were employed full-time, 186 (17.4%) were part-time, and 21 (2.0%) were unemployed.

History and culture
The local Pehiaweri Marae and Te Reo o te Iwi meeting house are a traditional meeting ground of the Ngāpuhi hapū of Ngāti Hao, Ngāti Hau, Te Parawhau and Te Uriroroi.

Education
Glenbervie School is a coeducational contributing primary (years 1–6) school with a roll of  students as of  The school was established in 1893.

Notes

External links
 Glenbervie Forest - Mountain Bike Tracks
 Glenbervie School website

Whangarei District
Populated places in the Northland Region